Gledys Ibarra (born November 19, 1960) is a Venezuelan television actress.

Filmography

Films

Television

References

External links 

Gledys Ibarra on Metralla Rosa

1960 births
Venezuelan telenovela actresses
20th-century Venezuelan actresses
21st-century Venezuelan actresses
Venezuelan film actresses
Living people
people from Maturín